Ben Amadou Sangaré (born 12 November 1990) is a French professional footballer who plays as an attacking midfielder for Championnat National 3 club US Ivry.

Career
On 30 January 2017, Sangaré signed a six-month contract with Azerbaijan Premier League club Zira FK, leaving the club at the end of May 2017.

In January 2018 he went on trial to Finnish Veikkausliiga side IFK Mariehamn, where he played as a substitute in a single 2017–18 Finnish Cup game against Klubi 04.

Career statistics

References

External links
Ben Sangaré profile at foot-national.com

1990 births
Living people
French footballers
French sportspeople of Ivorian descent
Association football forwards
Ligue 2 players
Championnat National players
Championnat National 2 players
Championnat National 3 players
Regionalliga players
Azerbaijan Premier League players
AS Nancy Lorraine players
Stade Briochin players
SC Freiburg players
SC Freiburg II players
US Ivry players
AC Arlésien players
US Créteil-Lusitanos players
Zira FK players
Sainte-Geneviève Sports players
French expatriate footballers
French expatriate sportspeople in Germany
Expatriate footballers in Germany
French expatriate sportspeople in Azerbaijan
Expatriate footballers in Azerbaijan